The Motorcycle Action Group (MAG) is a motorcycle riders' rights group based in the United Kingdom.

MAG was formed by Dennis Howard, Mick Griffiths, George Potter and Mohar Singh. The minutes of the first meeting held on 28 June 1973 identified MAG as being committed solely to the preservation of motorcycle freedom and continues "M.A.G. is opposed to all oppressive and discriminatory legislation aimed at motorcycling". The underlying reason for this meeting was because of proposed legislation to make the wearing of a motorcycle helmet  mandatory when riding a motorcycle on UK roads.

Activities
MAG has since expanded its activities, and campaigns, advocates and educates across a range of topics relating to motorcycling and issues that might impact upon riders' rights. The organisation is led by volunteers, and focuses its campaigns on the protection and promotion of motorcycling. MAG represents riders of all abilities and experience levels, and supports parties and rallies, motorcycle sport and touring.

MAG operates in a distributed fashion. Local and regional groups formed of individual members elect representatives who lead the local group which are then grouped together into regions. Their representatives contribute to national decision-making through the national committee. Each year the MAG annual general conference elects it chairman and directors through voting by individual members. Local and regional groups undertake a range of activities directly relating to motorcycling in the group's area.

MAG headquarters in Warwickshire maintains a small permanent staff including former Member of Parliament Lembit Opik, 
and Colin Brown, campaigns manager. MAG is involved with a range of high level bodies including the UK Department for Transport Road Safety Delivery Group.

In 2003, some of MAG's motorcycle safety and other non-political activities were moved into the newly formed charitable arm, the MAG Foundation, to enable these activities to be supported directly in a tax-efficient way.

MAG is a founder member of the Federation of European Motorcyclists, 
now the Federation of European Motorcyclists Associations.

See also
Motorcycling
ABATE
American Motorcyclist Association
British Motorcyclists Federation
Helmet Law Defense League (HLDL)

References

External links 
 
 MAG Foundation
 

Motorcycle clubs in the United Kingdom
Motorcyclists organizations
Motorcycle safety organizations
Motorcycle regulation
1973 establishments in the United Kingdom